Chryseofusus hyphalus is a species of sea snail, a marine gastropod mollusk in the family Fasciolariidae, the spindle snails, the tulip snails and their allies.

Description
The shell size varies between 35 mm and 96 mm

Distribution
This species is distributed in the seas along the Philippines, Taiwan and Japan.

References

External links
 

Fasciolariidae
Gastropods described in 1940